The government of Luis Muñoz Marín was that of the first elected governor. In addition to that, it was the first whose cabinet did not receive the advice and consent of the United States Senate, but from the Puerto Rico Senate. This all came as part of the 1947 Puerto Rico Elective Governor Act. During this government, the Puerto Rican people addressed via Puerto Rico Federal Relations Act of 1950's mechanism the creation of their own constitution, which was ratified and enacted in the latter months of the Muñoz Marín government, which reconfigured the system of government by creating the Puerto Rico Council of Secretaries and enlarged the Legislative Assembly's chambers. The Commonwealth of Puerto Rico was established, and the 1952 Commonwealth Constitution is, with some amendments, the current constitution of the archipelago.

Party breakdown 
Party breakdown of cabinet members, not including the governor:

The cabinet was composed of members of the PPD and two independents or technical positions (or people whose membership in a party was not clearly ascertained from any available media).

After the Constitution got adopted in July 1952, this balance changed to:

Members of the Initial Cabinet 
The Puerto Rican Cabinet was led by the Governor alone in this period. The Cabinet was composed of all the heads of the  executive departments of the insular government. A feature of this government is a reshuffle and recomposition of the Cabinet with the introduction of the Constitution of Puerto Rico in July 1952. This involved changing names of offices, and a transition to the fully constitutional government of the Commonwealth.

Constitutional Cabinet 
The new cabinet is a continuation of the old, although positions were changed, split, or reshuffled with the new constitutional order.

Notes

References 

Government of Puerto Rico
Governors of Puerto Rico
Members of the Cabinet of Puerto Rico by session
Cabinet of Puerto Rico